Johana Gómez (born February 4, 1989 in Acarigua, Portuguesa, Venezuela) is a Venezuelan softball player. She competed for Venezuela at the 2008 Summer Olympics.

Gomez played softball for Lee University in the United States.

References

Living people
1989 births
Lee Flames softball players
Olympic softball players of Venezuela
Softball players at the 2008 Summer Olympics
Venezuelan softball players
21st-century Venezuelan women